Notiphila is a genus of shore flies (insects in the family Ephydridae). There are at least 160 described species in Notiphila.

See also
 List of Notiphila species

References

Further reading

External links

 

Ephydridae
Articles created by Qbugbot
Ephydroidea genera